Globisinum is a genus of predatory sea snails, marine gastropod mollusks in the family Naticidae, the moon snails.

Species
Species within the genus Globisinum include:
 † Globisinum crassiliratum Finlay, 1926 
 Globisinum drewi (Murdoch, 1899)
 † Globisinum miocaenicum (Suter, 1917)
 † Globisinum spirale (P. Marshall, 1917)

 Species brought into synonymy
 Globisinum venustum (Suter, 1907): synonym of Globisinum drewi (Murdoch, 1899)
 Globisinum wollastoni Finlay, 1927: synonym of  Globisinum drewi (Murdoch, 1899)

References

Naticidae